Jimmy Roger Moreland Jr. (born August 26, 1995) is an American football cornerback for the New York Jets of the National Football League (NFL). He played college football at James Madison and was drafted by the Washington Redskins in the seventh round of the 2019 NFL Draft.

Early years
Moreland was born in Belle Glade, Florida, and attended Royal Palm Beach High School.

College career
Moreland played college football James Madison University, starting at cornerback for their football team from 2014 until 2018. Known there as a "ball hawk", he accounted for 18 total interceptions, returning five of them for touchdowns, both school records.

Professional career

Washington Redskins / Football Team
Moreland was drafted by the Washington Redskins in the seventh round, 227th overall, of the 2019 NFL Draft. The Redskins placed him on injured reserve on December 17, 2019 after suffering a foot injury in the Week 15 game against the Philadelphia Eagles. In Week 1 against the Eagles, he recorded his first career interception off a pass thrown by Carson Wentz in a 27–17 win. Moreland was waived on August 31, 2021.

Houston Texans
Moreland was claimed off waivers by the Houston Texans on September 7, 2021. He was released on May 20, 2022.

Philadelphia Eagles
On May 23, 2022, Moreland was claimed off waivers by the Philadelphia Eagles. He was waived/injured on August 16 and placed on injured reserve. He was released on August 24.

New York Jets
On September 14, 2022, Moreland signed with the practice squad of the New York Jets. He signed a reserve/future contract on January 9, 2023.

References

External links
James Madison Dukes bio

1995 births
Living people
American football cornerbacks
James Madison Dukes football players
People from Belle Glade, Florida
Players of American football from Florida
Sportspeople from the Miami metropolitan area
Washington Redskins players
Washington Football Team players
Houston Texans players
Philadelphia Eagles players
New York Jets players